Walter Clement Alvarez (July 22, 1884June 18, 1978) was an American medical doctor of Spanish descent. He authored several dozen books on medicine, and wrote introductions and forewords for many others.

Biography
He was born in San Francisco and spent his childhood in Hawaii, where his father was a government physician. In 1910, having received his medical education in Stanford University, he began his practice.

From 1913 to the end of 1925, Alvarez practiced internal medicine in San Francisco and conducted research at the University of California, Berkeley. He lived at 3837 Clay Street raising his family.  In 1934 he became Professor of Medicine at the University of Minnesota (Mayo Foundation) and later served as Consultant in Medicine Emeritus.

His father was Luis F. Alvarez, who worked as a physician in California and Hawaii and developed a method for the better diagnosis of macular leprosy.  His sister was California artist and oil painter Mabel Alvarez.

Alvarez was married to the former Harriet Skidmore Smythe and the couple had four children:  Gladys, Luis, Robert and Bernice. Luis later became a Nobel Prize-winning physicist.

His grandson is Walter Alvarez, a Professor of Geology at the University of California, Berkeley.

Beginning after his retirement in 1951, Alvarez began writing a medical column which soon became syndicated throughout North America in hundreds of daily and weekly newspapers. The Walter C. Alvarez Memorial Award is named in his honor and is presented to a member or nonmember of the American Medical Writers Association to honor excellence in communicating health care developments and concepts to the public.  He is most notable for his enlightened approach to homosexuality and his efforts to educate the medical profession and the broader public about the topic. He is regarded as an ally of the homophile movement in the 1950s-1970s.

Alvarez' syndrome, a syndrome of hysterical or neurotic abdominal bloating without any excess of gas in the digestive tract, and Alvarez-waves, painless uterine contractions occurring during the length of pregnancy, are named after him.

Alvarez was the first to investigate electric activity of a stomach and, thereby, became the founder of a new diagnostic gastroenterology branch — electrogastrography.

He died in California in 1978.

His personal papers are held by Lane's Archives and Special Collections.

Publications

References

External links

Early Photograph of Walter C. Alvarez
Archive Dump - Alvarez March 26, 2005 genealogy.com

1884 births
1978 deaths
20th-century American physicians
American expatriates in the Hawaiian Kingdom
American gastroenterologists
American people of Spanish descent
Diet food advocates
University of California, Berkeley staff
University of Minnesota faculty
Writers from San Francisco
Hispanic and Latino American scientists
Hispanic and Latino American physicians